Club Deportivo Iruña is a Spanish football team based in Pamplona, in the autonomous community of Navarre. Founded in 1939, it plays in Primera Autonómica de Navarra, holding home matches at Estadio Paternain, with a capacity of 3,000 seats. The club is named after the Basque language name of Pamplona.

CD Iruña has also a women's volleyball team which plays since 2012 in Superliga Femenina de Voleibol.

In June 2016, Iruña signed an agreement with CA Osasuna to become its second reserve team during the next five seasons. The Iruña team had to play at least one division below the main reserve team Osasuna B (Promesas), and neither reserve team could enter the Copa del Rey.

In the 2017–18 Tercera División season, Iruña finished 3rd which would normally permit entry to the promotion playoffs; however, Osasuna B were relegated from Segunda B, and due to the hierarchy rules, Iruña were instead demoted to the Primera Autonómica de Navarra for the coming campaign, bringing to an end a 15-year sequence of maintaining their status at the same level.

In the summer of 2020, with Iruña having been unable to climb back up from the regional level, their affiliation with Osasuna was ended (though they would remain a local partner club) and a new arrangement was made with CD Subiza to act as the feeder to the professional club's B-team.

Season to season

24 seasons in Tercera División

References

External links
Official website 
La Preferente team profile 
Futbolme team profile 
Futnavarra team profile 
RFEVB profile

 

Football clubs in Navarre
Sport in Pamplona
Association football clubs established in 1939
CA Osasuna
1939 establishments in Spain
Multi-sport clubs in Spain